Oakland Mall is an enclosed super-regional shopping mall located in the city of Troy, Michigan, a suburb of Detroit. It is located in the northwest corner of the intersection of 14 Mile and John R. roads, adjacent to Interstate 75 (Chrysler Freeway). The mall features 116 stores, including a food court, plus several big-box stores on the periphery.  The mall has .  The anchor stores are Macy's, JCPenney, Dick's Sporting Goods, At Home, and Hobby Lobby.

History
The first store to open at the site of the Oakland Mall was Sears, which opened in 1965. In 1968, the mall itself opened, featuring Hudson's as another anchor. Also included was an S. S. Kresge dime store.  In 1979 an expansion added a two-story wing anchored by JCPenney.

Borders Books & Music opened in 1999. The store, formerly a Winkleman's clothing store, was the first Borders to be located in a mall in Michigan. The movie theaters were closed in 2000 and were later converted to Steve & Barry's, which itself closed in early 2009. Hudson's was converted to Marshall Field's in 2001. In 2004, Lord & Taylor was proposed to become the mall's fourth department store; however, the store never materialized. September 2006 saw the conversion of Marshall Field's (and other May Co. nameplates) to the Macy's name. Borders closed in 2011 due to the chain's bankruptcy. In 2013, Forever 21 moved from its existing location in the Sears wing to the former Borders. In late 2014, the Gibraltar Furniture and Rug store in the former Steve & Barry's closed. In this area a new Dick's Sporting Goods was moved from the across the street shopping center to the mall, which opened in fall 2015. H&M opened a 20,000 square ft. store in the Macy's wing. Field & Stream opened northwest of JCPenney in March 2015. In 2016, the mall was taken over by CBRE.

In 2015, Sears Holdings spun 235 of its properties, including the Sears at Oakland Mall, into Seritage Growth Properties. Krispy Kreme and Logan's Roadhouse are also outparcels on the Seritage site. In 2017, in an effort similar to Macomb Mall's Sears, Oakland Mall split off a section of its Sears to become an At Home. On June 28, 2018, Sears announced that its Oakland Mall location would be closing as part of a plan to close 78 stores nationwide. The store closed on September 2, 2018. In 2022, the remaining portion of the former Sears store became Hobby Lobby which opened on December 26th, 2022. 

In October 2019, Dick's Sporting Goods sold the Field & Stream to Sportsman's Warehouse. In 2020, Oakland Mall was acquired by CenterCal Properties, before being sold again in March 2022 to Mario Kiezi, who announced plans to renovate the mall.

References

External links

Official website
Aerial Photo from Google Maps

Shopping malls in Oakland County, Michigan
Shopping malls established in 1968
Buildings and structures in Troy, Michigan
1965 establishments in Michigan